Enicopus pilosus is a species of soft-winged flower beetles belonging to the family Melyridae, subfamily Dasytinae.

Description
The body is completely black, with long hair, especially in females. Hair are black in males, grayish in females. The males have a pointed appendage on the first article of the anterior tarsi and a flattened hook on the posterior tarsi.

Habitat
These beetles prefer open areas, forest edges, roads, fields, meadows and pastures. They are quite common in summer on the stems of Poaceae species.

Distribution
This species is mainly present in Croatia, France, Italy, Slovenia, Spain and Switzerland.

References

External links 
Henicopus pilosus Scop. - photos by S.I. Ruban
 Biolib
 Fauna europaea

Melyridae
Beetles of Europe
Beetles described in 1763
Taxa named by Giovanni Antonio Scopoli